is a Japanese writer and engineer. He is known for writing mystery novels – particularly his debut work The Perfect Insider, which won him the first Mephisto Prize in 1996 – but he considers himself to be a researcher as well as craftsman.

He insists his name to be written and called "MORI Hiroshi,"  family name first and uppercased, regardless of the language when romanized.

Biography

Mori as a craftsman
Since childhood, Mori was an avid model craftsman, making all kinds of models from race cars to locomotives to airplanes. He started out with a model locomotive that his father bought him as a birthday gift and was soon attracted to the process of making a miniature world of his own. Tools and materials for model making were readily available since his father ran a construction shop, and when Mori was in fifth grade, he built a manpowered car by putting two bicycles together.

Unlike most boys, Mori never grew out of this hobby; instead, his love for model crafts grew stronger as he became older. His interest moved on to radio control airplanes and he has so far constructed and flown over forty of them, some of which span about ten feet. Furthermore, he recently constructed a five-inch (127 mm) gauge railway in his garden. Mori confesses that one of the reasons for becoming a novelist was that he wanted to make more money to extend the miniature garden railway.

Mori as a manga artist
Starting from high school years, Mori was also engrossed in manga. When he was hospitalized in the second year of high school, he came across a work by Moto Hagio, author of several well-known shōjo manga series, which struck him deeply and made him realize the artistic beauty of manga. Indeed, Mori says that Hagio is the only artist whom he adores and that she was the one who inspired him to write not only manga but other literary works as well.

After joining a manga club at the university, Mori began to write and self-publish under the pen name Mori Muku. He also produced drawings and illustrations, and it was in the second year of university that he met Subaru Sasaki, an amateur artist with the same interests, who became both his wife and professional illustrator. Although Mori does not write manga anymore, he still claims to be a better manga artist than a novelist.

Mori as a researcher
Mori's true career started in 1982 when he became an assistant professor at Mie University. He had found interest in conducting research while he had been studying as a graduate student at Nagoya University, and upon completing his master's thesis, he took a job at the newly established Department of Architecture at Mie University. There, he specialized in rheology (a branch of physics that deals with deformation and flow of matter), and in particular, the studies of viscous-plastics.

In 1989, Mori became an associate professor at Nagoya University at the age of 31. He received a Doctorate of Engineering with a thesis on a numerical method for analyzing the flow of viscous plastic. Mori preferred not to become further promoted to professor, stating that he would lose his valuable research time to trivial meetings and other business. In March 2005, he resigned his post to become a professional writer.

Mori as a novelist
Finally, Mori made his debut as a novelist in April 1996 with The Perfect Insider. He won the very first Mephisto Prize for this, or rather, Editor Karaki says that the prize was established in the first place to make Mori's debut sensational. At this point, he had already written up three other novels, and the truth is that the first piece of work he had completed was Doctors in Isolated Room rather than The Perfect Insider, which was supposed to be the fourth piece in the series. The editor in chief, Hideo Uyama, decided to publish it first since it was the most shocking of the four.

Mori gives several reasons, in various interviews, as to why he started to write while working as associate professor. One of the reasons was that he had been saying jokingly that he would become a writer by forty, and another, already mentioned above, was that he wanted to have another source of income for his hobbies. However, the direct cause was that Mori simply wanted to impress his daughter who was a big fan of mystery novels.

As a writer, Mori is known among his editors to be prolific and punctual. In fact, he finished his first novel in just a week by sparing a mere three hours at night after a day's work at the university. Although he writes very fast, he admits that he is not a good reader, and curiously, the bulk of his time is spent reading proof sheets rather than actually writing. At the same time, Mori is extremely punctual, and his editor Misa Inako affirms that he has never missed a deadline.

Mori has so far produced over thirty mystery novels; moreover, he has worked on a wide variety of genres in the past few years, including romance, poetry, essays, photo books, and children's picture books. Particularly notable is An Automaton in Long Sleep, an adventure fiction about an automaton from 120 years ago, which was written in commission of Coca-Cola for the base story of its 120th anniversary television drama in Japan, happen to become Mori's first work to be dramatized on television. Manga versions for some of his works have been published as well.

Criticism
Mori's writings are called "rikei mystery," which roughly translates into "science mystery." This is most likely because Mori uses his experience as a research scientist and weaves some kind of a science- or math-related problem into the story (for example, several math puzzles were presented in Mathematical Goodbye). However, Mori says that he is reluctant to label his novels that way, and he goes on to question what is really meant when people say "science".

In addition, Mori's works, especially The Perfect Insider, is often criticized for the overuse of computer jargons. He responds that it is perfectly natural for people with some background knowledge to have a better understanding than others. According to Mori, computer jargons are not much different from proper nouns, like the names of celebrities or fashion brands, in the sense that they are in most cases just there as ornament that serves to create a particular mood.

Translated works

English translation
 Seven Stories, trans. Ryusui Seiryoin (The BBB: Breakthrough Bandwagon Books, 2016)
 S&M (Professor Saikawa and his student Moe) short stories
 "The Rooftop Ornaments of Stone Ratha" (original title: Sekitō no Yane Kazari)
 "Which Is the Witch?" (original title: Dochiraka ga Majo)
 Other mystery short stories
 "The Girl Who Was the Little Bird" (original title: Kotori no Ongaeshi)
 "A Pair of Hearts" (original title: Katahō no Piasu)
 "I'm in Debt to Akiko" (original title: Boku wa Akiko ni Kari ga Aru)
 "Silent Prayer in Empty" (original title: Kokū no Mokutōsha)
 "Kappa" (original title: Kappa)
 The Sky Crawlers, trans. Ryusui Seiryoin (The BBB: Breakthrough Bandwagon Books)
 The Sky Crawlers (February 2017)
 None But Air (February 2018)
 Down to Heaven (March 2019)
 Flutter Into Life (February 2020)
 Cradle the Sky (February 2021)
 Sky Eclipse (February 2022)

French translation
The Sky Crawlers series
 The Sky Crawlers (Glénat, 2010)
 None But Air (Glénat, 2011)

Bibliography
S&M series

V series

Hundred years series

Four Seasons

G series

The Sky Crawlers series

Short story collections

 M series

 Z series
ZOKU
ZOKUDAM
ZOKURANGER
 Other novels

References

External links
Profile at The BBB: Breakthrough Bandwagon Books 
Profile at J'Lit Books from Japan
 
Akubi Lightweight Railway Bentengaoka Short Line 
Entry in The Encyclopedia of Science Fiction

20th-century Japanese novelists
21st-century Japanese novelists
Japanese mystery writers
1957 births
Living people
People from Aichi Prefecture
Nagoya University alumni
Academic staff of Nagoya University
Writers from Aichi Prefecture
Academic staff of Mie University